Jacquies Smith (pronounced "Jack", born March 18, 1990) is a former defensive end. In 2014, Smith recorded 6.5 sacks in 7 starts for the Tampa Bay Buccaneers. In 2015, Smith is credited with 7 quarterback sacks in the 11 games that he was healthy enough to play. During that season, a Bleacher Report article on Smith was entitled, "Jacquies Smith's Wild Ride to Become the NFL's Best Player You've Never Heard of."

Early years
Smith grew up in an impoverished Oak Cliff section of Dallas, Texas and was raised by his grandmother. Through most of his childhood, Smith's father was incarcerated. His grandfather, Herbert Jones, was a U.S. Army veteran and prominent AAU coach whose players included such Dallas high school stars as Dennis Rodman and Larry Johnson. His grandfather specifically coached and encouraged his development as a football, track, and basketball player beginning when Smith was a young child.

Smith graduated from South Oak Cliff High School in 2008. He was an All-Midlands Region defensive lineman by PrepStar Magazine.

He was recruited to play football at the University of Missouri.

College career
After his sophomore season at Missouri, Smith was All-Big 12, Honorable Mention. He was also named Missouri's Most Improved Defensive lineman during the spring practice session.

Smith was named 2nd-Team All-Big 12 after his junior season, and he also received the team's Jeff Rigman Outstanding Underclassman Leadership Award

Prior to his senior season, Smith was named to the "watch list" for both the Lombardi Award and the College Football Performance Award for the country's best defensive lineman. Smith was also named to variety of preseason all-star teams: Lindy's, Blue Ribbon, Athlon, and Phil Steele. An elbow injury limited action during that senior year, and Smith ended up the year without end-of-season accolades.

Smith went undrafted in the 2012 NFL Draft.

Professional career

Miami Dolphins
On May 4, 2012, he signed with the Miami Dolphins as an undrafted free agent. On August 25, 2012, he was released among roster cuts.

Hamilton Tiger-Cats
On October 1, 2012, he signed with the Hamilton Tiger-Cats of the Canadian Football League. After a brief stay in Canada (one recorded sack for the Tiger-Cats), he returned to Texas to be available for NFL opportunities.

New York Jets
On December 4, 2012, he signed with the New York Jets to join the practice squad. On December 31, he was signed with the New York Jets to a reserve/future contract. He was released on August 31, 2013.

Buffalo Bills
Smith signed with the Buffalo Bills on December 30, 2013.

Tampa Bay Buccaneers
Smith signed with the Tampa Bay Buccaneers on September 10, 2014 after the team had waived rookie defensive end Scott Solomon. Since joining Tampa Bay Smith was able to go from a rotational defensive lineman to beating out William Gholston for the starting defensive end position. Under Lovie Smith's Tampa 2 system Smith has recorded 17 combined tackles, 13 solo tackles, 6.5 sacks, and 1 forced fumble for the 2014 season in only 8 starts.

On November 1, 2015, Smith left with an ankle injury in Week 8's matchup against the Atlanta Falcons. On November 6, 2015, the Tampa Bay Buccaneers ruled Smith out for Week 9's matchup against the New York Giants. On November 13, 2015, the Buccaneers ruled Smith out for Week 10's matchup against the Dallas Cowboys. On November 22, 2015, Smith was cleared to play in Week 11's matchup against the Philadelphia Eagles.  On December 4, 2015, the Tampa Bay Buccaneers ruled Smith out for Week 13's matchup against the Atlanta Falcons due to a hamstring injury.

On September 12, 2016, Smith was placed on injured reserve after he sustained a right knee injury in the season-opening win against the Atlanta Falcons.

On October 5, 2017, Smith was released by the Buccaneers.

Detroit Lions
On October 18, 2017, Smith signed with the Detroit Lions. He was released on October 28, 2017 but was re-signed two days later. He was waived on November 14, 2017.

Arizona Cardinals
On July 26, 2018, the Arizona Cardinals signed Smith to a one-year contract. He was released by the Cardinals on September 24, 2018.

Oakland Raiders
On November 5, 2018, Smith was signed by the Oakland Raiders. He played in three games before being placed on injured reserve on November 26, 2018 with an Achilles injury.

Seattle Dragons
Smith was selected by the Seattle Dragons in the 2020 XFL Draft. He had his contract terminated when the league suspended operations on April 10, 2020.

After Sports
As of 2020, Smith was an NFL free agent.

Smith's father, who had been incarcerated throughout his childhood, was released from prison in 2011. As of 2015, Smith's father was in ministry school and was preaching in Tyler, Texas.

References

External links
Missouri Tigers bio
New York Jets bio

1990 births
Living people
American football defensive ends
Missouri Tigers football players
Miami Dolphins players
Hamilton Tiger-Cats players
New York Jets players
Buffalo Bills players
Tampa Bay Buccaneers players
Detroit Lions players
Arizona Cardinals players
Oakland Raiders players
Players of American football from Dallas
Players of Canadian football from Dallas
Seattle Dragons players